Tall Soleymani (also Romanized as Tall Soleymānī) is a village in Rostaq Rural District, Rostaq District, Darab County, Fars Province, Iran. At the 2006 census, its population was 48, in 10 families.

References 

Populated places in Darab County